Kisii Airport is an airport in Kisii County, Kenya.

Location
Kisii Airport  is located in Suneka District, Kisii County, in the town of Suneka which is approx 8 km from Kisii Town a major commercial Hub, in southwestern  Kenya, on the eastern shores of Lake Victoria, close to the International borders with Tanzania and Uganda. This is the only airstrip in Kisii and Nyamira counties.

The geographic coordinates of this airport are:0° 40' 21.00"S, 34° 41' 20.00"E (Latitude:-0.672500; Longitude:34.688890).

Overview
Kisii Airport is a small civilian airport, serving the southwestern Kenya'n  town of Kisii, and surrounding communities.

Airlines and destinations
There is no regular, scheduled airline service to Kisii Airport at this time.

See also
 Kenya Airports Authority
 Kenya Civil Aviation Authority
 List of airports in Kenya

References

External links
  Location of Kisii Airport At Google Maps
  Website of Kenya Airports Authority
 List of Airports In Kenya

Airports in Kenya
Kisii County
Nyanza Province